Kelvin Owusu Bossman (born 20 January 1991) is a Ghanaian footballer who plays as a forward for Marlow.

Club career 
Born in Ghana, Bossman moved to the United Kingdom aged 9. He joined the Reading Academy in 2002 and progressed through the age groups, signing scholarship forms in 2007. In December 2008 he joined Basingstoke Town on work experience. He made his debut against Eastleigh and made eight appearances in total, scoring once, before returning to Reading in February. Soon after he joined Conference Premier side Woking on a similar deal until the end of the season, making a further eight appearances. Despite top scoring for the academy with seven goals from 14 games during 2008–09, he left Reading at the end of the season having not been offered a professional contract.

He signed for Eredivisie side FC Groningen in 2009 after a two-week trial and played in the reserve team. He suffered a serious knee injury during his time with the club and failed to make an appearance for the first-team, joining Eerste Divisie side SC Cambuur on loan in March 2011. After leaving Groningen he joined Helmond Sport and spent one season with the club, making 20 appearances in all competitions. He left the club in 2012 having not been offered a new contract after breaking his metatarsal.

In October 2012, Bossman returned to England with Conference South side Maidenhead United. After making just two appearances in four months, he moved to divisional rivals Havant & Waterlooville on a short-term contract. He made eight appearances, seven coming as a substitute, but left the club in May 2013 having declined the offer of a new contract. In August 2013 he joined Southern League Premier Division side Cambridge City on non-contract terms. He remained with the club for just two weeks before returning to the Conference South with Hayes & Yeading United. He made his debut in a 1–0 win over Dover Athletic.

After less than three months with Hayes & Yeading, Bossman returned to Cambridge City in November on a game-by-game basis, citing "personal reasons" for the move.

On 18 February 2020, Bossman made his 100th appearance for Marlow.

International career 
Bossman represented Ghana at the under-17 World Cup, making five appearances and scoring once against Trinidad and Tobago.

Career statistics

Personal life 
Bossman's brother Allen is also a footballer who as of the 2013–14 season plays for Cheshunt.

References

External links 
 
 

1991 births
Living people
Ghanaian footballers
Ghanaian expatriate footballers
Expatriate footballers in England
Expatriate footballers in the Netherlands
Association football forwards
Reading F.C. players
Basingstoke Town F.C. players
Woking F.C. players
FC Groningen players
SC Cambuur players
Helmond Sport players
Maidenhead United F.C. players
Havant & Waterlooville F.C. players
Hayes & Yeading United F.C. players
Cambridge City F.C. players
Biggleswade Town F.C. players
Enfield Town F.C. players
National League (English football) players
Southern Football League players
Eerste Divisie players